Thorleif Dymling Reiss (May 22, 1898 – April 14, 1988) was a Norwegian actor.

Career
Reiss made his debut at the National Theater in Oslo in 1918. From 1931 to 1939, he was employed at the Carl Johan Theater, where he also served as co-director. From 1942 onward he was employed at the New Theater.

Family
Reiss was the son of the lawyer, composer, and musicologist Georg Reiss and Elisabeth Dymling (1861–1920). He was the brother of the pianist and cabaret performer Elisabeth Reiss and the father of the actor Helge Reiss. He played opposite his son in the 1970 crime comedy Skulle det dukke opp flere lik er det bare å ringe. His first marriage was in 1920 to Esther Colbjørnsen Dahl (1896–1941). After her death, he remarried in 1944 to Gunborg Kristiane Skistad (1911–2001).

Filmography

1922: Die Gezeichneten as Alexander Krasnow (Sasha)
1933: Jeppe på bjerget as Victor
1941: Gullfjellet as Pettersen
1942: Den farlige leken as Mr. Holt
1942: Det æ'kke te å tru as Harald Hagen
1943: Den nye lægen as Mørch, an engineer
1946: Englandsfarere as the lawyer
1948: Kampen om tungtvannet as Jomar Brun, an engineer
1948: Trollfossen as Kavli, an office manager
1954: I moralens navn as Alf Mowitz
1958: I slik en natt as the chief doctor
1959: Jakten
1970: Balladen om mestertyven Ole Høiland as Count Wedel Jarlsberg
1970: Skulle det dukke opp flere lik er det bare å ringe as Direktor Marthinsen
1971: 3
1972: Motforestilling
1974: Under en steinhimmel as the minister
1977: Karjolsteinen as the judge
1982: Henrys bakværelse as customer #2

References

External links
 
 Thorleif Reiss at Sceneweb
 Thorleif Reiss at Filmfront
 Thorleif Reiss at the National Theater
 Thorleif Reiss at the Swedish Film Database

1898 births
1988 deaths
20th-century Norwegian male actors
Male actors from Oslo